The 1914 Kansas City Packers season was a season in American baseball. The Packers finished in 6th place in the Federal League, 20 games behind the Indianapolis Hoosiers.

Regular season

Season standings

Record vs. opponents

Notable transactions 
 April 20, 1914: Chief Johnson jumped to the Packers from the Cincinnati Reds.
 May 1914: Jack Enzenroth jumped to the Packers from the St. Louis Browns.

Roster

Player stats

Batting

Starters by position 
Note: Pos = Position; G = Games played; AB = At bats; H = Hits; Avg. = Batting average; HR = Home runs; RBI = Runs batted in

Other batters 
Note: G = Games played; AB = At bats; H = Hits; Avg. = Batting average; HR = Home runs; RBI = Runs batted in

Pitching

Starting pitchers 
Note: G = Games pitched; IP = Innings pitched; W = Wins; L = Losses; ERA = Earned run average; SO = Strikeouts

Other pitchers 
Note: G = Games pitched; IP = Innings pitched; W = Wins; L = Losses; ERA = Earned run average; SO = Strikeouts

Relief pitchers 
Note: G = Games pitched; W = Wins; L = Losses; SV = Saves; ERA = Earned run average; SO = Strikeouts

Notes

References 
1914 Kansas City Packers at Baseball Reference

Kansas City Packers seasons
Kansas City Packers season
1914 in sports in Missouri